The Sellswords is a trilogy of fantasy novels written by R. A. Salvatore, whose related works include The Legend of Drizzt series and The Hunter's Blades Trilogy. It contains three books, Servant of the Shard (also included as the third book in the Paths of Darkness quartet, which books were later published as the 11th through 14th books of The Legend of Drizzt), Promise of the Witch-King, and Road of the Patriarch.

Plot
The trilogy continues the tale of the infamous assassin, Artemis Entreri, previously featured in books as Drizzt Do'Urden's self-proclaimed archenemy, and the cunning drow mercenary, Jarlaxle, previously relevant as the leader of Bregan D'aerthe, an outlaw group of drow based primarily in and around Menzoberranzan, that does business mostly with the drow of Menzoberranzan.  Continuing the story of Artemis and Jarlaxle told in the Paths of Darkness series, Artemis and Jarlaxle begin an adventure that tests their skills, their minds, and their souls.

While the two characters are antagonists in the Drizzt Do'Urden series, in The Sellswords trilogy they are the main characters of some of the few books in Salvatore's Forgotten Realms novels that do not focus on the legendary drow warrior, Drizzt Do'Urden, as the hero of the novel. The Sellswords develops the two characters more deeply than was possible in the other Salvatore books, giving the reader an in depth view of the mind of the cold, calculating Artemis Entreri and the ambitious, opportunistic Jarlaxle.

Works included

 Servant of the Shard (2000)
 Promise of the Witch-King (2005)
 Road of the Patriarch (2006)

Reception
Pat Ferrara of mania.com comments: "The second book of arguably the coolest Forgotten Realms literary spin-off to date, Promise of the Witch-King continues the Sellswords Series without skipping a beat. Tightly knit plotlines, absurd yet memorable and engaging characters, and hellishly fast-paced storytelling culminate in a wild melee of swords and sorcery led by the master himself."

The audio recording of Road of the Patriarch received a favorable review from California Bookwatch, which praised all aspects of the novel, including the plot, the action, and the narration by David Colacci.

References

External links

 

Book series introduced in 2000
Forgotten Realms novel series